Dan Boone is a Nazarene minister, author, and university president.

Biography
Dan Boone is a descendant of the frontiersman Daniel Boone.  He has served as the senior pastor of North Raleigh Church of the Nazarene in Raleigh, North Carolina, Trevecca Community Church of the Nazarene in Nashville, Tennessee and College Church of the Nazarene in Bourbonnais, Illinois, which serves Olivet Nazarene University, as well as the Kankakee-Bradley-Bourbonnais, Illinois community.

In 2005, Dan Boone was elected to serve as the 11th president of Trevecca Nazarene University.  He finished his first term as President in 2009 and was elected to a second four-year term in the Spring of 2009.  Having seen his school's application to join the NCAA rejected in 2010, he announced they would reapply in 2011.

Dan Boone earned his Doctor of Ministry from McCormick Theological Seminary. He is also a 1977 graduate of Nazarene Theological Seminary and a 1974 graduate of Trevecca Nazarene University.   In 2009 he was selected to be part of the 34th Leadership Nashville class.

On March 24, 2017, Trevecca announced a partnership with Eastern Nazarene College in Quincy, Mass., which includes Boone serving as president of both institutions while they worked toward a merger. Boone served as president-elect of ENC until 2018. In March 2018, the merger process was discontinued  and Boone stepped away from his ENC role as required by Trevecca's accrediting association.

Author
The following books have been written by Dan Boone.  They were all published by Nazarene Publishing House/Beacon Hill Press of Kansas City.

 Answers for Chicken Little-A No-Nonsense Look at the Book of Revelation (2006)
 Dirty Hands, Pure Hearts:  Sermons and Conversations with Holiness Preachers  (2006) Beacon Hill Press of Kansas City
 The Worship Plot: Finding Unity in Our Common Story (2007)
 Seven Deadly Sins: The Uncomfortable Truth (2008)
 Preaching The Story That Shapes Us (2008)
 Dancing With the Law: The Ten Commandments (2010)
 A Charitable Discourse: Talking About The Things That Divide Us (2011)
 The Lord's Prayer: Imagine It Answered (October 1, 2012); Dust Jacket Press
 The Church in Exile: Interpreting Where We Are (October 2, 2012); Dust Jacket Press
 The Dark Side of God (2013); Elevate Entertainment LLC.
 The Way We Work: How Faith Makes a Difference on the Job (July 2014); Beacon Hill Press/Nazarene Publishing House
 Human Sexuality: A Primer for Christians (Trevecca Press, 2015)

References

External links
 DanBoone.me
 Trevecca Nazarene University presidential biography 
 Nazarene Theological Seminary Alumni BIO

American Christian writers
American Nazarene ministers
American non-fiction writers
Heads of universities and colleges in the United States
Living people
McCormick Theological Seminary alumni
Nazarene Theological Seminary alumni
Trevecca Nazarene University alumni
Trevecca Nazarene University faculty
Year of birth missing (living people)